Kam Piri (Kam Pīrī  in the Afghan language) is a village in Bamyan Province in central Afghanistan.

See also
Bamyan Province

References 

Populated places in Bamyan Province